1989 was a turning point in political history with the "Revolutions of 1989" which ended communism in Eastern Bloc of Europe, starting in Poland and Hungary, with experiments in power-sharing coming to a head with the opening of the Berlin Wall in November, the Velvet Revolution in Czechoslovakia and the overthrow of the communist dictatorship in Romania in December; the movement ended in December 1991 with the dissolution of the Soviet Union. Revolutions against communist governments in Eastern Europe mainly succeeded, but the year also saw the suppression by the Chinese government of the 1989 Tiananmen Square protests in Beijing.

It was the year of the first Brazilian presidential election in 29 years, since the end of the military government in 1985 that ruled the country for more than twenty years, and marked the redemocratization process's final point.

F. W. de Klerk was elected as State President of South Africa, and his regime gradually dismantled the apartheid system over the next five years, culminating with the 1994 election that brought jailed African National Congress leader Nelson Mandela to power.

The first commercial Internet service providers surfaced in this year, as well as the first written proposal for the World Wide Web and New Zealand, Japan and Australia's first Internet connections. The first babies born after preimplantation genetic diagnosis were conceived in late 1989.

Events

January 
 January 1 – The New York Times discloses involvement of West German company Imhausen and Salzgitter AG in building a chemical weapon plant in Rabta, Libya.
 January 2 – Prime Minister Ranasinghe Premadasa takes office as the third President of Sri Lanka.
 January 4 – Gulf of Sidra incident (1989): Two Libyan MiG-23 "Floggers" are engaged and shot down by two US Navy F-14 Tomcats.
 January 7 – Emperor Shōwa dies; his son Akihito is enthroned as the 125th Emperor of Japan immediately, followed by the change in the era name from Shōwa to Heisei on the following day.
 January 10 – In accordance with United Nations Security Council Resolution 626 and the New York Accords, Cuban troops begin withdrawing from Angola.
 January 11 – The Lexus and Infiniti luxury car brands are launched at the North American International Auto Show in Detroit with the unveiling of the 1990 Lexus LS and Infiniti Q45 sedans.
 January 15 – Thirty-five European nations, meeting in Vienna, agree to strengthen human rights and improve East–West trade.
 January 18 – Ante Marković succeeds Branko Mikulić as Prime Minister of Yugoslavia.
 January 20 – George H. W. Bush is sworn in as the 41st President of the United States.
 January 23–24 – Armed civilian leftists briefly attack and occupy an Argentinian army base near Buenos Aires.
 January 30 
 Prime Minister of Canada Brian Mulroney shuffles his cabinet, appointing six new ministers and reassigning the responsibilities of nineteen others.
 The Embassy of the United States, Kabul, Afghanistan, is closed; it does not reopen until late 2001.

February 
 February 1 – In Australia, Joan Kirner becomes Victoria's first female Deputy Premier, after the resignation of Robert Fordham over the VEDC (Victorian Economic Development Co-operation) Crisis.
 February 2
 Soviet–Afghan War: The last Soviet Union armoured column leaves Kabul, ending nine years of military occupation since 1979.
 Carlos Andrés Pérez takes office as President of Venezuela.
 February 3
 1989 Paraguayan coup d'état ("La Noche de la Candelaria"): A military coup overthrows Alfredo Stroessner, dictator of Paraguay since 1954.
 After a stroke, State President of South Africa P. W. Botha resigns as Leader of the National Party.
 February 5 – Eurosport, a multiple-language sports broadcasting station in Europe, begins broadcasting, from Issy-les-Moulineaux, Île-de-France, France.
 February 6 – The Government of the People's Republic of Poland holds formal talks with representatives of Solidarity movement for the first time since 1981.
 February 7 – The People's National Party, led by Michael Manley, wins the 1989 Jamaican general election.
 February 10
 Ron Brown is elected as Chairman of the Democratic National Committee, becoming the first African American to lead a major United States political party.
 U.S. President Bush meets Canadian Prime Minister Brian Mulroney in Ottawa, laying the groundwork for the Acid Rain Treaty of 1991.
 February 11 – Barbara Harris is the first woman consecrated as a bishop of the Episcopal Church in the United States of America (and also the first woman to become a bishop in the worldwide Anglican Communion).
 February 14
 Union Carbide agrees to pay $470,000,000 to the Indian government for damages in the 1984 Bhopal disaster, a gas leak that killed 3.7 thousand.
 The Satanic Verses controversy: Ayatollah Ruhollah Khomeini, Supreme Leader of Iran (d. June 3), issues a fatwa calling for the death of Indian-born British author Salman Rushdie and his publishers for issuing the novel The Satanic Verses (1988).
 The first of 24 Global Positioning System satellites is placed into orbit.

 February 15
 Soviet–Afghan War: The Soviet Union announces that all of its troops have left Afghanistan.
 Following a campaign that saw over 1,000 people killed in massive campaign-related violence, the United National Party wins the Sri Lankan parliamentary election.
 February 16 – Pan Am Flight 103: Investigators announce that the cause of the 1988 crash was a bomb hidden inside a radio-cassette player.
 February 17
 The Arab Maghreb Union (AMU) is formed.
 South African police raid the home of Winnie Mandela and arrest four of her bodyguards.
 February 20 – In Canada's Yukon Territory, the ruling New Democrats narrowly maintain control of the Yukon Legislative Assembly, winning 9 seats vs. the Progressive Conservative Party's 7.
 February 23 – After protracted testimony, the U.S. Senate Armed Services Committee rejects, 11–9, President Bush's nomination of John Tower for Secretary of Defense.
 February 23–27 – U.S. President Bush visits Japan, China and South Korea, attending the funeral of Hirohito and then meeting with China's Deng Xiaoping and South Korea's Roh Tae-woo.
 February 24
 The funeral of Hirohito is attended by representatives of 160 nations.
 The Satanic Verses controversy: Iran places a $3,000,000 bounty on the head of The Satanic Verses author Salman Rushdie.
 Singing Revolution: After 44 years, the Estonian flag is raised at the Pikk Hermann tower in Tallinn.
 United Airlines Flight 811, a Boeing 747, suffers uncontrolled decompression after leaving Honolulu International Airport; nine passengers are blown out of the cabin to their deaths.
 February 27 – Venezuela is rocked by the Caracazo, a wave of protests and looting.

March 

 March – Poland begins to liberalise its currency exchange in a move towards capitalism.
 March 1
 The Berne Convention, an international treaty on copyrights, is ratified by the United States.
 A curfew is imposed in Kosovo, where protests continue over the alleged intimidation of the Serb minority.
 The Politieke Partij Radicalen, Pacifistisch Socialistische Partij, Communistische Partij Nederland and the Evangelical People's Party amalgamate to form the Dutch political party GroenLinks (GL, GreenLeft).
 After 74 years, Iceland ends its prohibition on beer; celebrated since as bjórdagur or beer day.
 March 2 – Twelve European Community nations agree to ban the production of all chlorofluorocarbons (CFCs) by the end of the century.
 March 3 – Jammu Siltavuori abducts and murders two eight-year-old girls in the Myllypuro suburb of Helsinki, Finland.
 March 4
 Time Inc. and Warner Communications announce plans for a merger, forming Time Warner. (Now Warner Bros. Discovery)
 The Purley station rail crash in London leaves five people dead and 94 injured.
 The first Australian Capital Territory elections are held.
 March 7 – Iran breaks off diplomatic relations with the United Kingdom over Salman Rushdie's The Satanic Verses.
 March 9 – Revolutions of 1989: The Soviet Union submits to the jurisdiction of the World Court.
 March 12 – Tim Berners-Lee produces the proposal document that will become the blueprint for the World Wide Web.
 March 13 – A geomagnetic storm causes the collapse of the Hydro-Québec power grid. 6,000,000 people are left without power for nine hours. Some areas in the northeastern U.S. and in Sweden also lose power, and aurorae are seen as far as Texas.
 March 14
 Gun control: U.S. President George H. W. Bush bans the importation of certain guns deemed assault weapons into the United States.
 General Michel Aoun declares a "War of Liberation" to rid Lebanon of Syrian forces and their allies.
 March 15 
 Israel hands over Taba to Egypt, ending a seven-year territorial dispute.
 Mass demonstrations in Hungary, demanding democracy.
 March 16 – The Central Committee of the Communist Party of the Soviet Union approves agricultural reforms allowing farmers the right to lease state-owned farms for life.
 March 17
 The Civic Tower of Pavia, built in the eleventh century, collapses.
 Alfredo Cristiani is elected as President of El Salvador.
 March 20 – Australian Prime Minister Bob Hawke weeps on national television as he admits marital infidelity.
 March 22
 Clint Malarchuk of the NHL Buffalo Sabres suffers a near-fatal injury when another player accidentally slits his throat.
 March 23 – Stanley Pons and Martin Fleischmann announce that they have achieved cold fusion at the University of Utah.
 March 23–28 – The Socialist Republic of Serbia passes constitutional changes revoking the autonomy of the Socialist Autonomous Province of Kosovo, triggering six days of rioting by the Albanian majority, during which at least 29 people are killed.
 March 24 – Exxon Valdez oil spill: In Alaska's Prince William Sound, the Exxon Valdez spills  of oil after running aground.
 March 26 – 1989 Soviet Union legislative election: The first (and last) contested elections for the Soviet parliament, Congress of People's Deputies, result in losses for the Communist Party; the first session of the new Congress opens in late May.
 March 29 – The 61st Academy Awards are held at the Shrine Auditorium in Los Angeles, with Rain Man winning Best Picture, and Jodie Foster wins her first award for Best Actress.

April 

 April 1 – Margaret Thatcher's new local government tax (the poll tax) is introduced in Scotland. It will be introduced in England and Wales the following year.
 April 2
 In South-West Africa, fighting erupts between SWAPO insurgents and the South West African Police on the day that a ceasefire was supposed to end the South African Border War according to United Nations Security Council Resolution 435. By April 6, nearly 300 people are killed.
 April 4 – A failed coup attempt against Prosper Avril, President of Haiti, leads to a standoff between mutinous troops and the government which ends on April 10, with the government regaining control of the country.
 April 5 – The Polish Government and the Solidarity trade union sign an agreement restoring Solidarity to legal status, and agreeing to hold democratic elections on June 4 (Polish Round Table Agreement), which initiates the 1989 revolution and the overthrow of communism in Central Europe.
 April 6 – National Safety Council of Australia chief executive John Friedrich is arrested after defrauding investors to the tune of $235,000,000.
 April 7 – The Soviet submarine K-278 Komsomolets sinks in the Barents Sea, killing 41.
 April 9
 Tbilisi massacre: Georgian demonstrators are massacred by Soviet Army soldiers in Tbilisi's central square during a peaceful rally; 20 citizens are killed, many injured. This causes further protests.
 A dispute over grazing rights leads to the beginning of the Mauritania–Senegal Border War.
 April 14 – The U.S. government seizes the Irvine, California, Lincoln Savings and Loan Association; Charles Keating (for whom the Keating Five are named) eventually goes to jail, as part of the massive 1980s savings and loan crisis which costs U.S. taxpayers nearly $200,000,000 in bailouts, and many people their life savings.
 April 15
The Hillsborough disaster, one of the biggest tragedies in European football, claims the lives of 94 Liverpool F.C. supporters in Sheffield, England, a further three dying later.
Hu Yaobang, the former General Secretary of the Chinese Communist Party, dies. The public reaction to his death spawned a chain of events which led to the Tiananmen Square protests of 1989.
 April 17 – Solidarity (Polish trade union) is once again legalised and allowed to participate in semi-free elections on June 4.
 April 19
 Central Park jogger case: Trisha Meili is seriously assaulted and raped whilst jogging in New York City's Central Park; the convictions of five teenagers for the crime are vacated in 2002 (the jogger's identity remains secret for years, hence she is referred to as the "Central Park Jogger").
 The USS Iowa turret explodes on the U.S. battleship Iowa, killing 47 crew members.
 April 20 – NATO debates modernising short range missiles; although the US and UK are in favour, West German Chancellor Helmut Kohl obtains a concession deferring a decision.
 April 21 – Students from Beijing, Shanghai, Xi'an and Nanjing begin protesting in Tiananmen Square in Beijing.
 April 23 – Zaid al-Rifai resigns as Prime Minister of Jordan in the wake of riots over government-imposed price hikes that began on April 18.
 April 25
 Noboru Takeshita resigns as Prime Minister of Japan in the wake of a stock-trading scandal.
 Motorola introduces the Motorola MicroTAC personal cellular telephone, the world's smallest mobile phone at this time.
 April 26
 Sultan Azlan Muhibbudin Shah ibni Almarhum Sultan Yusuff Izzudin Shah Ghafarullahu-lahu, Sultan of Perak, becomes the 9th Yang di-Pertuan Agong of Malaysia, succeeding Baginda Almutawakkil Alallah Sultan Iskandar Al-Haj ibni Almarhum Sultan Ismail.
 Zaid ibn Shaker succeeds Zaid al-Rifai as Prime Minister of Jordan.
 The Daulatpur–Saturia tornado, the deadliest tornado ever recorded, kills an estimated 1,300 people in the Dhaka Division of Bangladesh.
 April 27 – A major demonstration occurs in Beijing as part of the 1989 Tiananmen Square protests.

May 
 May
 Transhumanism: Genetic modification of adult human beings is tried for the first time, a gene tagging trial.
 The Soviet Union issues its first Visa card in a step to digitalise its banking system.
 May 1 – Andrés Rodríguez, who seized power and declared himself President of Paraguay during a military coup in February, wins a landslide victory at a general election marked by charges of fraud.
 May 2
 The first crack in the Iron Curtain: Hungary dismantles  of barbed wire fencing along the border with Austria.
 The coalition government of Prime Minister of the Netherlands Ruud Lubbers collapses in a dispute about a pollution cleanup plan.
 May 3 – Cold War: Perestroika – The first McDonald's restaurant in the USSR begins construction in Moscow. It will open on January 31, 1990.
 May 4 – Oliver North is convicted in the United States on charges related to the Iran–Contra affair. His conviction is vacated on appeal in 1991.
 May 9 – Andrew Peacock deposes John Howard as Federal Opposition Leader of Australia.
 May 10 – The government of President of Panama Manuel Noriega declares void the result of the May 7 presidential election, which Noriega had lost to Guillermo Endara.
 May 11
 President Bush orders 1,900 U.S. troops to Panama to protect Americans there.
 The ACT (Australian Capital Territory) Legislative Assembly meets for the first time.
 May 12–25 – San Bernardino train disaster: Southern Pacific freight locomotive SP 7551 East derails in a residential area of San Bernardino, California, killing four and destroying seven houses. On May 25, as a direct result of the derailment, the Calnev Pipeline explodes, killing an additional two people and destroying eleven more houses and 21 cars.
 May 14
 Mikhail Gorbachev visits China, the first Soviet leader to do so since Nikita Khrushchev in the 1960s, ending the Sino-Soviet split.
 Carlos Menem wins the Argentine presidential election.
 May 15
 Australia's first private tertiary institution, Bond University, opens on the Gold Coast.
 The last golden toad is seen in Costa Rica; the species is subsequently classified as extinct.
 May 17
1989 Tiananmen Square protests: More than 1,000,000 Chinese protesters march through Beijing demanding greater democracy, leading to a crackdown.
In Stuttgart Napoli of Diego Maradona wins the Uefa Cup.
 May 19
 1989 Ürümqi unrest: Uyghur and Hui Muslim protesters riot in front of the government building in Ürümqi, China.
 1989 Tiananmen Square protests: Zhao Ziyang meets the demonstrators in Tiananmen Square.
 Ciriaco De Mita resigns as Prime Minister of Italy.
 May 20 – 1989 Tiananmen Square protests: The Chinese government declares martial law in Beijing.
 May 24 
Milan of Italy wins the European Cup beating Steaua București of Romania 4–0 in Barcelona.
Assassinations of Jeffrey Brent Ball and Todd Ray Wilson: A terrorist organization, Zarate Willka Armed Forces of Liberation, kills two American missionaries of the Church of Jesus Christ of Latter-day Saints as they return to their apartment, in La Paz, Bolivia.
 May 25 – The Calgary Flames defeat the Montreal Canadiens four games to two to win the franchise's first Stanley Cup in ice hockey.
 May 29
 Amid food riots and looting set off by inflation, the Government of Argentina declares a nationwide state of siege.
 NATO agrees to talks with the Soviet Union on reducing the number of short-range nuclear weapons in Europe.
 An attempted assassination of Miguel Maza Marquez, director of the Departamento Administrativo de Seguridad (DAS) in Bogotá, Colombia is committed by members of the Medellín Cartel, who kill four and injure 37.
 May 31 – Six members of the guerrilla group Revolutionary Movement Tupac Amaru (MRTA) of Peru, shoot dead eight gay and transgender people in the city of Tarapoto.

June 

 June 1–10 – Pope John Paul II visits Norway, Iceland, Finland, Denmark and Sweden.
 June 2 – Sōsuke Uno succeeds Noboru Takeshita as Prime Minister of Japan.
 June 3 – The world's first high-definition television (test) broadcasts commence in Japan, in analogue.
 June 4
 1989 Tiananmen Square protests and massacre: A violent military crackdown takes place on pro-democracy protesters in Tiananmen Square, Beijing.
 1989 Polish legislative election: Solidarity's victory in the first round is the first of many anti-communist revolutions of 1989 in Central and Eastern Europe.
 Ufa train disaster: A natural gas explosion near Ufa, Russia kills 575 as two trains passing each other throw sparks near a leaky pipeline.
 June 5 
 1989 Tiananmen Square protests: An unknown Chinese protester, "Tank Man", stands in front of a column of military tanks on Chang'an Avenue in Beijing, temporarily halting them, an incident which achieves iconic status internationally through images taken by Western photographers.
 State funeral of Ruhollah Khomeini: Eight people are killed and hundreds injured in a human crush during the viewing of the body of Iranian leader Ayatollah Khomeini at the Musalla in Tehran, two days after his death at the age of 89 in Tehran.
 June 6 – State funeral of Ruhollah Khomeini: The Ayatollah Khomeini's first funeral in Tehran is aborted by officials after a large crowd storms the funeral procession, nearly destroying Khomeini's wooden casket in order to get a last glimpse of his body. At one point, his body almost falls to the ground, as the crowd attempt to grab pieces of the death shroud. The Ayatollah's body has to be returned for the burial preparations to be repeated, before being brought back to the cemetery a few hours later.
 June 7 – Surinam Airways Flight 764 crashes in Paramaribo, Suriname, killing 176.
 June 15 – At the 1989 Irish general election, Fianna Fáil, led by Taoiseach Charles Haughey, fails to win a majority.
 June 16 – A crowd of 250,000 gathers at Heroes Square in Budapest for the historic reburial of Imre Nagy, the former Hungarian Prime Minister who had been executed in 1958.
 June 18 – In the first Greek legislative election of the year, the Panhellenic Socialist Movement, led by Prime Minister of Greece Andreas Papandreou, loses control of the Hellenic Parliament.
 June 22
 British police arrest 260 people celebrating the summer solstice at Stonehenge.
 The University of Limerick and Dublin City University are raised to the status of universities, the first established in Ireland since independence in 1922.
 June 24 – Jiang Zemin becomes General Secretary of the Chinese Communist Party.
 June 30 – 1989 Sudanese coup d'état A military coup led by Omar al-Bashir ousts the civilian government of Prime Minister of Sudan Sadiq al-Mahdi.

July 
 July 2 – Andreas Papandreou, Prime Minister of Greece, resigns; a new government is formed under Tzannis Tzannetakis.
 July 5
 State President of South Africa P. W. Botha meets the imprisoned 70-year-old Nelson Mandela face-to-face for the first time.
 The television sitcom Seinfeld premieres in the United States.
 July 6 – The Tel Aviv–Jerusalem bus 405 suicide attack, the first Palestinian suicide attack on Israel, takes place.
 July 9–12 – U.S. President George H. W. Bush travels to Poland and Hungary, pushing for U.S. economic aid and investment.
 July 10 – Approximately 300,000 Siberian coal miners go on strike, demanding better living conditions and less bureaucracy; it is the largest Soviet labour strike since the 1920s.
 July 12
 In the Republic of Ireland, the Taoiseach Charles Haughey returns to power after Fianna Fáil forms a coalition with the Progressive Democrats.
 Lotte World, a major recreation complex in Seoul, South Korea, is opened to the public, containing the world's largest indoor amusement park.
 July 14 – France celebrated the 200th anniversary of the French Revolution, notably with a monumental show on the Champs-Élysées in Paris, directed by French designer Jean-Paul Goude. President François Mitterrand acted as host for invited world leaders.
 July 14–16 – At the 15th G7 summit, leaders call for restrictions on gas emissions.
 July 17
 The Northrop Grumman B-2 Spirit stealth bomber makes its first flight, in the United States.
 Holy See–Poland relations: Poland and the Vatican re-establish diplomatic relations after approximately fifty years.
 July 18 – Actress Rebecca Schaeffer is murdered by an obsessed fan, leading to stricter stalking laws in California.
 July 19
 1989 Polish presidential election: The National Assembly of the Republic of Poland elects General Wojciech Jaruzelski to the restored and powerful post of President of Poland.
 United Airlines Flight 232 (Douglas DC-10) crashes in Sioux City, Iowa, killing 112; 184 on board survive.
 The first national park in the Netherlands is established on Schiermonnikoog.
 July 20 – Burmese opposition leader Aung San Suu Kyi is placed under house arrest. She is released in 2010.
 July 23
 1989 Japanese House of Councillors election: Japan's ruling Liberal Democratic Party loses control of the House of Councillors, the LDP's worst electoral showing in 34 years, leading to Prime Minister Uno announcing he will resign to take responsibility for the result.
 Giulio Andreotti takes office as Prime Minister of Italy.
 July 26 – A federal grand jury indicts Cornell University student Robert Tappan Morris for releasing a computer virus, making him the first person to be prosecuted under the United States' 1986 Computer Fraud and Abuse Act.
 July 27 – In the largest prison sentence to date, Thai financial scammer Mae Chamoy Thipyaso and her accomplices are each sentenced to 141,078 years in prison.
 July 28 – At the Iranian presidential election, electors overwhelmingly elect Akbar Hashemi Rafsanjani as President of Iran and endorse changes to the Constitution of the Islamic Republic of Iran, increasing the powers of the president.
 July 31
 In Lebanon, Hezbollah announces that it has hanged U.S. Marine Lt. Col. William R. Higgins in retaliation for Israel's July 28 kidnapping of Hezbollah leader Abdel Karim Obeid. The same day, the United Nations Security Council passes United Nations Security Council Resolution 638, condemning the taking of hostages by both sides in the conflict.
 Nintendo releases the Game Boy portable video game system in North America.

August 

 August – Gazprom, an energy production and sales organization in Russia, becomes state-run enterprise, changing from the Soviet Ministry of Gas Industry.
 August 2 – Pakistan is readmitted to the Commonwealth of Nations after leaving it in 1972.
 August 5 – Jaime Paz Zamora is elected President of Bolivia, taking office the next day.
 August 7
 U.S. Congressman Mickey Leland (D-TX) and fifteen others die in a plane crash in Ethiopia.
 The presidents of five Central American countries agree that the U.S.-backed contras fighting the government of Nicaragua should be disbanded and evicted from their bases in Honduras by December 5.
 August 8
 Prime Minister of New Zealand David Lange resigns for health reasons and is replaced by Geoffrey Palmer.
 STS-28: Space Shuttle Columbia takes off on a secret five-day military mission.
 August 9
 Toshiki Kaifu becomes Prime Minister of Japan.
 The asteroid 4769 Castalia is the first directly imaged by radar from Arecibo Observatory.
 The Financial Institutions Reform, Recovery, and Enforcement Act of 1989, a measure to rescue the United States savings and loan industry is signed into law by President Bush, launching the largest federal rescue to date.
 August 10 – United States Army General Colin Powell became the first Black Chairman of the Joint Chiefs of Staff after being nominated by President Bush.
 August 13 – 1989 Alice Springs hot air balloon crash: An accident near Alice Springs, Australia kills thirteen people.
 August 15 – P. W. Botha resigns as State President of South Africa and F. W. de Klerk becomes the seventh and final holder of this office under this style.
 August 18 – Leading Colombian presidential hopeful Luis Carlos Galán is assassinated near Bogotá.
 August 19
 Polish president Wojciech Jaruzelski nominates Solidarity activist Tadeusz Mazowiecki to be Prime Minister, the first non-Communist in power in 42 years.
 The Pan-European Picnic, a peace demonstration, is held at the Austro-Hungarian border.
 August 19–21 – In response to the murder of a judge, a provincial police chief, and presidential candidate Galán, the authorities of Colombia arrest 11,000 suspected Colombian drug traffickers.
 August 20
 In Beverly Hills, California, Lyle and Erik Menendez shoot their wealthy parents to death in the family's den.
 Marchioness disaster: Fifty-one people die when a pleasure boat collides with a dredger on the River Thames adjacent to Southwark Bridge in London.
 August 21 – The 21st anniversary of the crushing of the Prague Spring is commemorated by a demonstration in the city.

 August 23
 Singing Revolution: Two million indigenous people of Estonia, Latvia and Lithuania join hands to demand freedom and independence from Soviet occupation, forming an uninterrupted 600 km human chain called the Baltic Way.
 Hungary removes border restrictions with Austria.
 1989 Australian pilots' dispute: All of Australia's 1,645 domestic airline pilots resign over an airline's move to dismiss and sue them over a wage dispute.
 Murder of Yusef Hawkins in a shooting in the Bensonhurst section of Brooklyn, New York, sparking racial tensions between African Americans and Italian Americans.
 August 24
 Colombia's cocaine traffickers declare "total and absolute war" against the government and begin a series of bombings and arson attacks.
 Indonesia's first commercial television network, RCTI (stands for Rajawali Citra Televisi Indonesia), is established, and went on air for the first time.
 Tadeusz Mazowiecki of Solidarity is elected Prime Minister of Poland.
 August 25 – Voyager 2 makes its closest approach to Neptune and its largest moon Triton.
 August 31 – In the aftermath of the Chadian–Libyan conflict of 1978–87, representatives of Libya and Chad agree to let the International Court of Justice determine ownership of the Aouzou Strip, which has been occupied by Libya since 1973.

September 
 September 6
 1989 South African general election, the last held under the apartheid system, returns the National Party to power with a much-reduced majority.
 In the 1989 Dutch general election, the Christian Democratic Appeal, led by Ruud Lubbers wins 54 seats, and is ultimately able to form a government on November 7 after entering into coalition with the Labour Party.
 September 7 – Representatives of the government of Ethiopia and Eritrean separatists meet in Atlanta, with former U.S. President Jimmy Carter attempting to broker a peace settlement.
 September 8 – Partnair Flight 394 flies past an F-16 Fighting Falcon on its way home, then the Convair 580 rolls upside down and falls in the North Sea.
 September 10 – The Hungarian government opens the country's western border (with Austria) to refugees from East Germany.
 September 10–11 – Norway's ruling Labour Party loses eight seats in the parliamentary elections, its worst showing since 1945.
 September 14
 An agreement of co-operation between Leningrad Oblast (Russia) and Nordland County (Norway) is signed in Leningrad, by Chairmen Lev Kojkolainen and Sigbjørn Eriksen.
 Standard Gravure shooting: Joseph T. Wesbecker, a pressman on disability for mental illness, enters his former workplace in Louisville, Kentucky, kills eight people and injures twelve before committing suicide after a history of suicidal ideation.
 September 17–22 – Hurricane Hugo devastates the Caribbean and the southeastern United States, causing at least 71 deaths and $8,000,000,000 in damages.
 September 18 – Alleged coup attempt in Burkina Faso by military officials foiled.
 September 19
 The Catholic Church calls for removal of the Carmelite convent located near the former Auschwitz concentration camp, whose presence has offended some Jewish leaders.
 UTA Flight 772 explodes over Niger, killing all 171 people on board (the Islamic Jihad Organization claims responsibility).
 Burkinabé ministers Jean-Baptiste Boukary Lingani and Henri Zongo executed following their arrest the previous day.
 September 20 – F. W. de Klerk is sworn in as the seventh and last State President of South Africa. Soon afterwards he determines to suspend the South African nuclear weapons program.
 September 22
 1989 Deal barracks bombing: An IRA bomb explodes at the Royal Marine School of Music in Deal, Kent, United Kingdom, leaving 11 people dead and 22 injured.
 Doe v. University of Michigan: A Michigan court rules against the hate speech law at the University of Michigan, claiming it unconstitutional.
 September 23 
 A cease-fire in the Lebanese Civil War stops the violence that had killed 900 people since March.
 Nintendo Company Ltd. celebrates its 100th anniversary.
 September 26 – Vietnam announces that it has withdrawn the last of its troops from the State of Cambodia, ending an eleven-year occupation.
 September 30
 Nearly 7,000 East Germans who had come to Prague on special refugee trains are allowed to leave for the West.
 The Senegambia Confederation is dissolved over border disagreements.

October 

 October – Cold War: Perestroika – Nathan's Famous opens a hot dog stand in Moscow.
 October 1 – Civil union between partners in a same-sex relationship becomes legal in Denmark under a law enacted on June 7, the world's first such legislation.
 October 3
 A coup attempt is foiled by Manuel Noriega, military leader of Panama.
 The government of East Germany closes the country's border with Czechoslovakia to prevent further emigration to the West.
 October 5 – The Dalai Lama wins the Nobel Peace Prize.
 October 7
 The communist Hungarian Socialist Workers' Party votes to reorganise itself as a socialist party, to be named the Hungarian Socialist Party.
 The first mass demonstration against the Communist regime in the GDR begins in Plauen, East Germany, the beginning of a series of mass demonstrations in the whole GDR which ultimately leads to the reunification of Germany in 1990.
 October 9
 An official news agency in the Soviet Union reports the landing of a UFO in Voronezh.
 In Leipzig, East Germany, protesters demand the legalisation of opposition groups and democratic reforms.
 October 13
 Friday the 13th mini-crash: The Dow Jones Industrial Average plunges 190.58 points, or 6.91 percent, to close at 2,569.26, most likely after the junk bond market collapses.
 Gro Harlem Brundtland, leader of the Labour Party, resigns as Prime Minister of Norway. She is succeeded by Jan P. Syse, Leader of the Conservative Party, on October 16.
 October 15 – Walter Sisulu is released from prison in South Africa.
 October 17 – The 6.9  Loma Prieta earthquake shakes the San Francisco Bay Area and the Central Coast with a maximum Mercalli intensity of IX (Violent). Sixty-three people are killed and the 1989 World Series in baseball is postponed for ten days as a result of the earthquake.
 October 18
 The Communist leader of East Germany, Erich Honecker, is forced to step down as leader of the country after a series of health problems, and is succeeded by Egon Krenz.
 The National Assembly of Hungary votes to restore multi-party democracy.
 NASA launches the unmanned Galileo orbiter on a mission to study the planet Jupiter, via Atlantis mission STS-34.
 October 19 – The Guildford Four are freed after fourteen years' imprisonment in Britain.
 October 21 – The Commonwealth Heads of Government issue the Langkawi Declaration on the Environment, making environmental sustainability one of the Commonwealth of Nations's main priorities.
 October 23
 The Hungarian Republic is officially declared by President Mátyás Szűrös (replacing the Hungarian People's Republic), exactly 33 years after the Hungarian Revolution of 1956.
 The Phillips disaster, a chemical plant explosion, in Pasadena, Texas, kills 23 and injures 314 others.
 October 24 – The 1989 Bhagalpur violence, a major incident of religious violence, breaks out in Bhagalpur, Bihar, India; it will kill nearly 1,000 people.
 October 28 – The United States Flag Protection Act takes effect. There are mass protests in Seattle and New York City.
 October 30 – Shawn Eichman, Dave Blalock, Dread Scott and Joey Johnson burn American flags on the steps of U.S. Capitol Building to protest against the Flag Protection Act.
 October 31
 The Grand National Assembly of Turkey elects Prime Minister Turgut Özal as the eighth President of Turkey.
 Half a million people demonstrate in the East German city of Leipzig.

November 

 November – The first commercial dial-up Internet connection in North America is made, by The World STD.
 November 1
 The President of Nicaragua ends a ceasefire with U.S.-backed contras that has been in effect since April 1988.
 The border between East Germany and Czechoslovakia is reopened.
 November 3 – East German refugees arrive at the West German town of Hof after being allowed through Czechoslovakia.
 November 4
 Alexanderplatz demonstration in East Berlin. Half a million people protest against communist rule in East Germany.
 Typhoon Gay devastates Thailand's Chumphon Province.
 November 6 – The Asia-Pacific Economic Cooperation (APEC) is established.
 November 7
 Cold War: The Communist government of East Germany resigns, although SED leader Egon Krenz remains as head of state.
 Lieutenant Governor Douglas Wilder wins the Virginia gubernatorial race, becoming the first African-American elected Governor in the United States.
 David Dinkins becomes the first African-American mayor of New York City.
 November 9
 Cold War and Fall of the Berlin Wall: Günter Schabowski accidentally states in a live broadcast press conference that new rules for traveling from East Germany to West Germany will be put in effect "immediately". Late this evening, East Germany opens checkpoints in the Berlin Wall, allowing its citizens to travel freely to West Germany for the first time in decades. In the first week, travel visas will be issued to around 25% of the East German population.
 Yıldırım Akbulut of Motherland Party (Turkey) (ANAP) forms the new government of Turkey (47th government).
 November 10
 After 45 years of Communist rule in Bulgaria, Bulgarian Communist Party leader Todor Zhivkov is replaced by Foreign Minister Petar Mladenov, who changes the party's name to the Bulgarian Socialist Party.
 Gaby Kennard becomes the first Australian woman to fly solo around the world.
 November 12 – Brazil holds its first free presidential election since 1960.
 November 13 – Hans-Adam II becomes Prince of Liechtenstein on the death of his father, Prince Franz Joseph II.
 November 14 – Elections are held in Namibia, leading to a victory for the South West Africa People's Organisation.
 November 15
 Lech Wałęsa, leader of Poland's Solidarity movement, addresses a Joint session of the United States Congress.
 Brazil holds the first round of its first free election in 29 years; Fernando Collor de Mello and Luiz Inácio Lula da Silva advance to the second round, to be held the following month.
 November 16
 Six Jesuit priests are murdered by U.S. trained Salvadoran soldiers.
 The first American cosmetics shop in the Soviet Union, an Estée Lauder outlet, opens in Moscow.
 UNESCO adopts the Seville Statement on Violence at the 25th session of its General Conference.
 November 17 – Cold War: Velvet Revolution – A peaceful student demonstration in Prague, Czechoslovakia, is severely beaten back by riot police. This sparks a revolution aimed at overthrowing the Communist government (it succeeds on December 29).
 November 20 – Cold War: Velvet Revolution – The number of peaceful protesters assembled in Prague, Czechoslovakia, swells from 200,000 the day before to an estimated half-million.
 November 21 – The Members of the Constituent Assembly of Namibia begin to draft the Constitution of Namibia, which will be the constitution of the newly independent Namibia.
 November 22 – In West Beirut, a bomb explodes near the motorcade of Lebanese President René Moawad, killing him.
 November 24 – Following a week of demonstrations demanding free elections and other reforms, General Secretary Miloš Jakeš and other leaders of the Communist Party of Czechoslovakia resign. Jakeš is replaced by Karel Urbánek.
 November 26 – 1989 Uruguayan general election: Luis Alberto Lacalle is elected President of Uruguay.
 November 27 – Colombian domestic passenger flight Avianca Flight 203 is bombed by the Medellín drug cartel in an (unsuccessful) attempt to kill presidential candidate for the 1990 elections César Gaviria Trujillo.
 November 28 – Cold War: Velvet Revolution – The Communist Party of Czechoslovakia announces they will give up their monopoly on political power (elections held in December bring the first non-Communist government to Czechoslovakia in more than forty years).
 November 29 – Rajiv Gandhi resigns as Prime Minister of India after his party, the Indian National Congress, loses about half of its seats at the 1989 Indian general election.
 November 30 – Deutsche Bank board member Alfred Herrhausen is killed by a bomb in Bad Homburg (the Red Army Faction claims responsibility for the murder).

December 

 December 1
 In a meeting with Pope John Paul II, General Secretary of the Soviet Union Mikhail Gorbachev pledges greater religious freedom for citizens of the Soviet Union.
 Cold War: East Germany's parliament abolishes the constitutional provision granting the Communist-dominated Socialist Unity Party of Germany (SED) its monopoly on power. Egon Krenz, the Politburo and the Central Committee resign two days later.
 A military coup attempt begins in the Philippines against the government of Philippine President Corazon C. Aquino. It is crushed by United States intervention ending by December 9.
 December 2
 The Solar Maximum Mission scientific research satellite, launched in 1980, crashes back to earth.
 V. P. Singh takes office as Prime Minister of India.
 In the Republic of China legislative election, the Kuomintang suffers its worst election setback in forty years, winning only 53% of the popular vote.
 The Second Malayan Emergency concludes with a peace agreement. The Malayan Communist Party disbands and Chin Peng remains in exile in Thailand until his death in 2013.
 December 3
 The entire leadership of the ruling Socialist Unity Party in East Germany, including Egon Krenz, resigns. Hans Modrow becomes de facto the country's last leader.
 Cold War: Malta Summit – Concluding a 2-day meeting off the coast of Malta, U.S. President George H. W. Bush and Soviet leader Mikhail Gorbachev release statements indicating that the Cold War between their nations may be coming to an end. Gorbachev implies criticism of the 1968 Warsaw Pact invasion of Czechoslovakia.
 December 4 – Prime Minister of Jordan Zaid ibn Shaker resigns and is replaced by Mudar Badran.
 December 6
 The DAS Building bombing occurs in Bogotá, killing 52 people and injuring about 1,000.
 Egon Krenz resigns as Chairman of the State Council of the German Democratic Republic, and is replaced by Manfred Gerlach, the first non-Communist to hold that post.
 École Polytechnique massacre (or Montreal Massacre): Marc Lépine, an anti-feminist gunman, murders fourteen young women at the École Polytechnique de Montréal.
 December 7
 Ladislav Adamec resigns as Prime Minister of Czechoslovakia. He is succeeded by Marián Čalfa on December 10.
 Singing Revolution: The Lithuanian Soviet Socialist Republic becomes the first of the republics of the Soviet Union to abolish the Communist Party's monopoly on power.
 December 9 – The Socialist Unity Party of Germany elects the reformist Gregor Gysi as party leader.
 December 10
 President of Czechoslovakia Gustáv Husák swears in a new cabinet with a non-Communist and then immediately resigns as president.
 Tsakhiagiin Elbegdorj announces the establishment of Mongolia's democratic movement, that peacefully changes the second-oldest Communist country into a democracy.
 December 11 – The International Trans-Antarctica Expedition, a group of six explorers from six nations, reaches the South Pole.
December 12 – Hong Kong begins the forcible repatriation of Vietnamese boat people, starting with a group of 59 who were flown to Hanoi.
 December 14 – Chile holds its first free election in sixteen years, electing Patricio Aylwin as president. This marks the first time that all Ibero-American nations, except Cuba, have elected constitutional governments simultaneously.
 December 15 – Drug baron José Gonzalo Rodríguez Gacha is killed by Colombian police.
 December 16 – The Romanian Revolution begins in Timișoara, initiated by the Hungarian minority.
 December 17
 The Romanian Revolution continues in Timișoara when rioters break into the building housing the District Committee of the Romanian Communist Party and cause extensive damage. The military is called in but fails fully to control the situation.
 Brazil holds the second round of its first free election in 29 years; Fernando Collor de Mello is elected to serve as president from 1990.
 December 19 – Romanian Revolution: Workers in the cities go on strike in protest against the Communist regime. On December 20 about 100,000 occupy Timișoara.
 December 20 – The United States invasion of Panama ("Operation Just Cause") is launched in an attempt to overthrow Panamanian dictator Manuel Noriega.
 December 21 – Nicolae Ceaușescu addresses an assembly of some 110,000 people outside the Romanian Communist Party headquarters in Bucharest. Unprecedentedly, most of the crowd turns against him.
 December 22
 After a week of bloody demonstrations, Ion Iliescu takes over as President of Romania, ending the communist dictatorship of Nicolae Ceaușescu, who flees his palace in a helicopter after the palace is invaded by rioters. Most of the army has joined with the rioters in Bucharest.
 The Brandenburg Gate in Berlin is reopened.
 Two tourist coaches collide on the Pacific highway north of Kempsey, New South Wales, Australia, killing 35 people.
 December 23 – Nicolae and Elena Ceaușescu are captured in Târgoviște.
 December 24 – Charles Taylor's troops cross into Liberia from the Ivorian border, launching their first attack, sparking the First Liberian Civil War.
 December 25
 Trial and execution of Nicolae and Elena Ceaușescu: Deposed Romanian leader Nicolae Ceaușescu and his wife are summarily tried and executed outside Bucharest.
 Bank of Japan governors announce a major interest rate hike, eventually leading to the peak and fall of the economic bubble.
 December 28
 A  magnitude earthquake hits Newcastle, New South Wales, Australia, killing 13 people.
 Alexander Dubček is elected Chairman of Czechoslovakia's Federal Assembly (Parliament).
 December 29
 Czech playwright, philosopher and dissident Václav Havel is elected the first post-Communist President of Czechoslovakia.
 Riots break out after Hong Kong decides to forcibly repatriate Vietnamese refugees.
 Nikkei 225 for Tokyo Stock Exchange hits its all-time intra-day high of 38,957.44 and closing high at 38,915.87.
 December 31 – Poland's president signs the Balcerowicz Plan, ending the Communist system in Poland in favor of a capitalist system, leading to abandonment of the Warsaw Pact.

Date unknown 
 The first Al-Qaeda-related cell in the United States begins operation in New York City.
 Kamchatka opens to Russian civilian visitors.
 Richard C. Duncan introduces the Olduvai theory, about the collapse of industrial civilization.
 The global concentration of carbon dioxide in Earth's atmosphere reaches 350 parts per million by volume.
 Walmart posts revenues and profits triple its 1986 figures and rivals Kmart and Sears in importance in the American market.
 The Breguet Alizé propeller-driven anti-submarine planes are retired from active carrier service in the French Navy.
 N.W.A are the first gangsta rap group to sell 1,000,000 copies of an album with their controversial 1988 debut album Straight Outta Compton.

Births

January 

 January 1 – Adèle Haenel, French actress
 January 3 – Kōhei Uchimura, Japanese gymnast
 January 4
 Labrinth, British urban and hip-hop musician
 Julius Yego, Kenyan javelin thrower
 January 5 – Eduardo Escobar, Venezuela baseball player
 January 6 
 Andy Carroll, English footballer
 Nicky Romero, Dutch DJ
 January 9
 Michael Beasley, American basketball player
 Nina Dobrev, Bulgarian-born Canadian actress
 Lupita González, Mexican racewalker
 January 10
 Emily Meade, American actress
 Sarah Michel, French basketball player
 Heo Sol-ji, South Korean singer
 Zuria Vega, Mexican actress and singer
 January 11 – Naif Hazazi, Saudi footballer
 January 12 
 Arci Muñoz, Filipina actress and model
 Axel Witsel, Belgian footballer
 January 14 – Frankie Bridge, English singer
 January 15
 Ryan Corr, Australian actor
 Nicole Ross, American Olympic foil fencer
 Keiffer Hubbell, American ice dancer
 January 16 – Yvonne Zima, American actress
 January 19
 Thiago Lacerda, Brazilian actor
 Kelly Marie Tran, American actress
 Yani Tseng, Taiwanese golfer
 January 20 – Gonzalo Escobar, Ecuadorian tennis player
 January 21
 Murilo de Almeida, Brazilian-East Timorese footballer
 Doğuş Balbay, Turkish basketball player
 Henrikh Mkhitaryan, Armenian footballer
 Zhang Shuai, Chinese tennis player
 January 24 – Gong Lijiao, Chinese shot putter
 January 27 
 Daisy Lowe, British model
 Ricky van Wolfswinkel, Dutch footballer
 January 28 – Bruno Massot, French-born German pair skater
 January 30 – Lee Gun-woo, South Korean singer
 January 31 – Jessa Zaragoza, Filipina singer, actress and businesswoman

February 

 February 1 – Sara Jacobs, American politician
 February 2 – Ivan Perišić, Croatian footballer
 February 3 – Vania King, American tennis player
 February 4
 Nkosi Johnson, South African AIDS awareness campaigner (d. 2001)
 Larissa Ramos, Brazilian beauty pageant winner
 February 5 – Jeremy Sumpter, American actor
 February 7
 Neil Taylor, Welsh footballer
 Isaiah Thomas, American basketball player
 Elia Viviani, Italian track cyclist
 February 9
 Maxime Dufour-Lapointe, Canadian freestyle skier
 Wu Chia-ching, Taiwanese pool player
 February 10 
 Bashir Abdi, Somali born-Belgian marathon and long distance runner
 Neelofa, Malaysian actress
 February 11 – Lovi Poe, Filipina actress and singer
 February 15
 Mo Tae-bum, South Korean speed skater
 Ayaka Nishiwaki, Japanese singer and dancer
 February 16
 Elizabeth Olsen, American actress
 Zivanna Letisha Siregar, Indonesian model
 February 17
 Rebecca Adlington, British swimmer
 Chord Overstreet, American actor, singer and musician
 February 20
 Jack Falahee, American actor
 Mayu Kuroda, Japanese artistic gymnast
 February 21
 Corbin Bleu, American actor, model, dancer, film producer and singer-songwriter
 Jung Joon-young, Korean actor and singer
 February 24
 Trace Cyrus, American musician
 Daniel Kaluuya, English actor
 Kosta Koufos, Greek-born American basketball player
 February 25
 Kana Hanazawa, Japanese voice actress and singer
 Lee Sang-hwa, South Korean speed skater
 February 27 
 Koo Ja-cheol, South Korean footballer
 Stephen Kiprotich, Ugandan marathon runner
 February 28 – Zhang Liyin, Chinese singer

March 

 March 1
 Emma, Australian professional wrestler
 Daniella Monet, American actress and singer
 Carlos Vela, Mexican footballer
 March 2
 Jean-Frédéric Chapuis, French Olympic freestyle skier
 Nathalie Emmanuel, English actress
 Toby Alderweireld, Belgian football player
 March 3 – Macris Carneiro, Brazilian volleyball player
 March 5 – Sterling Knight, American actor
 March 6 – Agnieszka Radwańska, Polish tennis player
 March 7 – Gerald Anderson, Filipino actor
 March 9 – Taeyeon, South Korean singer
 March 10 – Etrit Berisha, Albanian footballer
 March 11
 Daniella Kertesz, Israeli actress
 Anton Yelchin, Russian-born American actor (d. 2016)
 March 12 – Tyler Clary, American Olympic swimmer
 March 13
 Holger Badstuber, German footballer
 Peaches Geldof, British columnist and model (d. 2014)
 Marko Marin, Bosnian born-German footballer
 Pierre Niney, French actor
 March 14 – Colby O'Donis, American singer
 March 15
 Gil Roberts, American sprinter
 Tom Bateman, English actor
 March 16
 Blake Griffin, American basketball player
 Theo Walcott, English footballer
 March 17
 Shinji Kagawa, Japanese football player
 Harry Melling, British actor 
 Mason Musso, American musician, singer and songwriter
 Morfydd Clark, Welsh actress
 March 18
 Lily Collins, British-born American actress
 Kana Nishino, Japanese singer-songwriter
 March 19 – Hannes Aigner, German slalom canoeist
 March 20 
 Heather Bergsma, American speed skater
 Xavier Dolan, Canadian  filmmaker, actor, director and costume designer
 Fei Fei Sun, Chinese model
 March 21
 Jordi Alba, Spanish professional footballer 
 Takeru Satoh, Japanese actor
 March 22
 J. J. Watt, American football player
 Aline Weber, Brazilian model
 March 23 – Eva de Goede, Dutch field hockey player
 March 25 – Aly Michalka, American actress and singer
 March 26 – Simon Kjær, Danish footballer
 March 27 – Vivian Wong Shir Yee, Malaysian politician
 March 29 – Arnold Peralta, Honduran footballer (d. 2015)
 March 31 – Liu Zige, Chinese swimmer

April 

 April 4 
 Chris Herd, Australian footballer
 Natália Pereira, Brazilian volleyball player
 April 5 
 Rachel Homan, Canadian curler
 Lily James, British actress
 Caia van Maasakker, Dutch field hockey player
 April 8
 Hitomi Takahashi, Japanese singer
 Gabriella Wilde, English actress and model
 April 10 
 Thomas Heurtel, French basketball player
 Éverton Ribeiro, Brazilian footballer
 April 11 – Iga Baumgart-Witan, Polish sprinter
 April 17 
 Martina Batini, Italian foil fencer
 Alexander Enbert, Russian pair skater
 Beau Knapp, American actor
 Wesley Koolhof, Dutch tennis player
 April 18
 Jessica Jung, American-born Korean singer
 Alia Shawkat, American actress
 April 19 
 Kim Nam-chun, South Korean footballer (d. 2020)
Simu Liu, Canadian actor, writer and stuntman 
 April 20
 Nina Davuluri, American public speaker and advocate
 Carlos Valdes, Colombian actor and singer
 April 21 – Tatyana McFadden, Russian-born American paralympian athlete
 April 22 – Louis Smith, British gymnast
 April 23
 Anastasia Baranova, Russian-born American actress
 Nicole Vaidišová, Czech tennis player
 April 24 – Ian Matos, Brazilian diver (d. 2021)
 April 25
 Emanuela de Paula, Brazilian model
 Michael van Gerwen, Dutch darts player
 Aysel Teymurzadeh, Azerbaijani pop singer
 April 26
 Luke Bracey, Australian actor
 Daesung, South Korean singer
 April 27 
 Lars Bender, German football player and coach
 Sven Bender, German football player and coach
 Gu Bon-gil, South Korean fencer
 April 28 
 Miriam Giovanelli, Italian born-Spanish actress and model
 Misato Nakamura, Japanese judoka
 Kim Sung-kyu, South Korean singer and dancer
 April 29 
 Foxes, British singer-songwriter
 Candace Owens, American conservative author, talk show host and producer

May 

 May 3 – Katinka Hosszú, Hungarian swimmer
 May 4
 Burcu Biricik, Turkish actress
 Greg Casar, American politician
 Dániel Gyurta, Hungarian swimmer
 Rory McIlroy, Northern Irish golfer
 James van Riemsdyk, American ice hockey player
 May 5 – Chris Brown, American singer and actor
 May 6
 Nanna Bryndís Hilmarsdóttir, Icelandic singer 
 Dominika Cibulková, Slovak tennis player
 Otto Knows, Swedish DJ and producer
 Anna Paulina Luna, American politician
 May 7
 Arlenis Sosa, Dominican model
 Earl Thomas, American football player
 May 8 
 Nora Arnezeder, French actress
 Katy B, British singer
 Natalia Kuziutina, Russian judoka
 May 9
 Daniel Rosenfeld, German musician, producer and sound engineer, best known as the composer and sound designer for the sandbox video game Minecraft
 Ellen White, English footballer
 May 10 – Lindsey Shaw, American actress
 May 11
 Cam Newton, American football player
 Prince Royce, American singer and songwriter
 Giovani dos Santos, Mexican footballer
 May 12 – Eleftheria Eleftheriou, Greek-Cypriot singer and actress
 May 13 – P. K. Subban, Canadian Ice Hockey player
 May 14
 Rob Gronkowski, American football player
 Alina Talay, Belarusian hurdler
 May 15 – Sunny Lee, American-born Korean singer
 May 17
 Olivia Luccardi, American actress and producer
 Tessa Virtue, Canadian ice dancer
 May 18
 Fatima Ali, Pakistani-born American chef (d. 2019)
 Shreevats Goswami, Indian cricketer
 May 21
 Emily Robins, New Zealand actress and singer
 Hal Robson-Kanu, Welsh footballer
 May 23
 Patrick Hougaard, Danish motorcycle speedway rider
 Ezequiel Schelotto, Italian football player
 Jeffery Taylor, Swedish basketball player
 May 24
 G-Eazy, American hip-hop rapper and producer
 Aki Kangasmäki, Finnish ice hockey player
 Kalin Lucas, American basketball player
 Adel Taarabt, Moroccan footballer
 May 25
 Guillaume Boivin, Canadian racing cyclist
 Aliona Moon, Moldovan pop singer
 May 26 – Park Ye-eun, Korean Singer
 May 27
 Peakboy, South Korean rapper, record producer, and singer-songwriter
 Afgan Syahreza, Indonesian pop singer and actor
 May 28 – Alexey Negodaylo, Russian Olympic bobsledder
 May 29
 Eyþór Ingi Gunnlaugsson, Icelandic singer
 Riley Keough, American model
 Brandon Mychal Smith, American actor
 May 30
 Ailee, Korean-American singer and songwriter
 Park Hyomin, South Korean singer
 May 31
 Pablo Alborán, Spanish singer
 Bas Dost, Dutch football player
 Sean Johnson, American soccer player
 Daul Kim, South Korean model (d. 2009)
 Marco Reus, German football player

June 

 June 1 – Nataliya Goncharova, Russian volleyball player
 June 2
 Steve Smith, Australian cricketer
 Shane Yarran, Australian rules footballer (d. 2018)
 June 3 
 Betssy Chávez, Peruvian politician and former Prime Minister of Peru
 Katie Hoff, American swimmer
 Imogen Poots, British actress
 June 4
 Pawel Fajdek, Polish hammer thrower
 Eldar Gasimov, Azerbaijani singer
 June 8
 Timea Bacsinszky, Swiss tennis player
 Minami Tsuda, Japanese voice actress
 Amaury Vassili, French operatic tenor
 June 9 – Chloë Agnew, Irish singer
 June 10 – Alexandra Stan, Romanian singer
 June 14 – Lucy Hale, American actress and singer
 June 17 – Simone Battle, American singer (d.2014)
 June 18
 Pierre-Emerick Aubameyang, French-born Gabonese footballer 
 Anna Fenninger, Austrian alpine ski racer
 Renee Olstead, American actress and singer
 June 19 – Giacomo Gianniotti, Italian-Canadian actor
 June 20 – Javier Pastore, Argentine footballer
 June 22
 Jeffrey Earnhardt, American race car driver
 Jung Yong Hwa, South Korean musician, singer-songwriter, record producer and actor
 June 23 – Lisa Carrington, New Zealand canoeist
 June 25 – Sam Ryder, British singer and songwriter
 June 27 – Matthew Lewis, British actor
 June 28
 Markiplier, American YouTube personality
 Josh Dunkley-Smith, Australian rower
 Joe Kovacs, American shot putter
 June 30 – Asbel Kiprop, Kenyan middle-distance runner

July 

 July 1
 Daniel Ricciardo, Australian Formula 1 driver
 Farouk Ben Mustapha, Tunisian footballer
 July 2
 Dev, American singer
 Alex Morgan, American soccer player
 July 3 – Elle King, American singer, songwriter, and musician
 July 4 
 Yoon Doo-joon, Korean singer
 Alyssa Miller, American model
 July 7
 Jamie Johnston, Canadian actor and singer-songwriter
 Kim Bum, South Korean actor
 July 8 – Yarden Gerbi, Israeli world champion judoka
 July 10 – Carlos Zambrano, Peruvian footballer
 July 11
 Rachael Blackmore, Irish jockey
 Shareeka Epps, American actress
 David Henrie, American actor and director
 Martin Klizan, Slovak tennis player
 July 12
 Phoebe Tonkin, Australian actress and model
 Rakep Patel, Kenyan cricketer
 July 13 – Sayumi Michishige, Japanese singer
 July 14 – Cyril Rioli, Australian rules footballer
 July 15 
 Alisa Kleybanova, Russian tennis player
 Tristan Wilds, American actor and singer
 July 16
 Gareth Bale, Welsh footballer
 Kim Woo-bin, South Korean model and actor
 July 17 – Evelyn Verrasztó, Hungarian swimmer
 July 18 – Jamie Benn, Canadian ice hockey player
 July 19 
 Reika Kakiiwa, Japanese badminton player
 Neto, Brazilian footballer
 July 21
 Chris Gunter, Welsh footballer
 Marco Fabián, Mexican footballer
 Rory Culkin, American actor
 July 22
 Trent Boult, New Zealand cricketer 
 Kamal G, Indian film director, film editor and film producer
 July 23
 Daniel Radcliffe, English actor
 Zhong An Qi, Taiwanese singer
 July 25 – Noel Callahan, Canadian actor
 July 26 – Ivian Sarcos, Venezuelan model and beauty queen who was crowned Miss World 2011
 July 27 
 Charlotte Arnold, Canadian actress
 Natalia Partyka, paralympic and olympic table tennis player
 July 28
 Adrien Broner, African-American professional boxer
 Felipe Kitadai, Brazilian Olympic medalist judoka
 Susannah Townsend, British field hockey player
 Amy Yang, South Korean golfer
 July 30 – Aleix Espargaró, Spanish Grand prix motorcycle racer
 July 31
 Victoria Azarenka, Belarusian tennis player
 Alexis Knapp, American actress and singer
 Aljamain Sterling, American-Jamaican mixed martial artist
 Marshall Williams, Canadian actor and musician
 Zelda Williams, American actress

August 

 August 1
 Tiffany Young, American-born Korean singer
 Tomoka Kurokawa, Japanese actress
 August 2 
 Nacer Chadli, Belgian footballer
 Alla Shishkina, Russian synchronized swimmer
 August 4
 Jessica Mauboy, Australian actress and singer-songwriter (Young Divas)
 Wang Hao, Chinese chess player
 August 5
 Shanshan Feng, Chinese golfer 
 Nina Radojičić, Serbian singer
 August 6 – Yu Wenxia, Chinese actress, television host, singer, model and beauty queen.
 August 7 – DeMar DeRozan, American basketball player
 August 10
 Sam Gagner, Canadian ice hockey player
 Ben Sahar, Israeli footballer
 Brenton Thwaites, Australian actor
 August 11 
 Úrsula Corberó, Spanish actress
 Emma Wu, Taiwanese singer and actress
 August 13 
 Fernando Pimenta, Portuguese sprint canoeist
 Zhang Weili, Chinese mixed martial artist
 August 14 – Ander Herrera, Spanish professional footballer
 August 15
 Belinda, Mexican singer and actress
 Joe Jonas, American musician, actor and singer
 Carlos PenaVega, American actor, dancer and singer
 August 17 
 Farah Zeynep Abdullah, Turkish actress
 Latisha Chan, Taiwanese tennis player
 August 19 
 Romeo Miller, American rapper, actor, entrepreneur and model
 Julianna Peña, American mixed martial artist
 August 20 – Judd Trump, English snooker player 
 August 21 – Hayden Panettiere, American actress and singer
 August 24 
 Tamara Csipes, Hungarian sprint canoeist
 Andrés Mercado, Colombian actor and singer
 August 26 – James Harden, American basketball player
 August 28 – Valtteri Bottas, Finnish Formula One driver
 August 29 
 Su Bingtian, Chinese sprinter
 Dawid Tomala, Polish race walker
 August 30 
 Bohdan Bondarenko, Ukrainian high jumper
 Bebe Rexha, American singer-songwriter
 August 31 – Laura Collett, British equestrian

September 

 September 1
 Bill Kaulitz, German singer
 Jefferson Montero, Ecuadorian footballer
 Daniel Sturridge, English footballer
 September 2
 Ronela Hajati, Albanian singer and songwriter
 Alexandre Pato, Brazilian footballer
 Zedd, Russian born-German record producer, DJ, musician, multi-instrumentalist and songwriter
 September 5 – Kat Graham, Swiss-born American actress, model, singer and dancer
 September 7 – Jonathan Majors, American actor 
 September 8 – Avicii, Swedish DJ, remixer and record producer (d. 2018)
 September 12
 Freddie Freeman, American baseball player
 Elyse Hopfner-Hibbs, Canadian artistic gymnast
 Andrew Luck, American football player
 September 13
 Jon Mannah, Australian rugby league player (d. 2013)
 Thomas Müller, German football player
 September 14
 Kazumi Evans, Canadian voice actress and singer
 Logan Henderson, American actor, dancer and singer
 Jonathon Simmons, American basketball player
 September 15 – Steliana Nistor, Romanian artistic gymnast
 September 16 – Braden Holtby, Canadian Ice Hockey player 
 September 17 – Ciara Horne, British cyclist
 September 19 
Tyreke Evans, American basketball player, 2010 NBA Rookie of the Year
Volkan Oezdemir, Turkish-Swiss mixed martial artist
 September 21 
 Jason Derulo, American urban singer and actor
 Svetlana Romashina, Russian synchronized swimmer
 September 22
 Audrey Cordon-Ragot, French racing cyclist
 Hyoyeon Kim, Korean singer
 Sabine Lisicki, German tennis player
 September 23 
 Sui He, Chinese model
 Mara Scherzinger, German actress
 September 24 – Pia Wurtzbach, German-Filipina actress and model
 September 25 
 Jordan Gavaris, Canadian actor
 Hanna Knyazyeva-Minenko, Ukrainian born-Israeli long and triple jumper
 September 27
 Rumi Okubo, Japanese voice actress
 Park Tae-hwan, South Korean swimmer
 September 29 – Theo Adams, British performance artist
 September 30 – Joel González, Spanish taekwondo practitioner

October 

 October 1 – Brie Larson, American actress
 October 2 – Frederik Andersen, Danish Ice Hockey player
 October 4
 Dakota Johnson, American actress
 Kimmie Meissner, American figure skater
 Viktoria Rebensburg, German alpine skier
 October 5 
 Travis Kelce, American football player
 Lais Ribeiro, Brazilian model
 Tsvetelina Yaneva, Bulgarian singer
 October 10 – Aimee Teegarden, American actress
 October 11
 Tomoyuki Sugano, Japanese baseball pitcher
 Michelle Wie, American golfer
 October 12 – Paulo Henrique Ganso, Brazilian football player
 October 13 – Alexandria Ocasio-Cortez, American politician and activist
 October 15 
 Yuliya Gerasymova, Ukrainian volleyball player
 Anthony Joshua, British professional boxer
 Delfina Merino, Argentine field hockey player
 October 16 – Dan Biggar, Welsh rugby union player
 October 17
 Kyle Carpenter, American former marine and Medal of Honor recipient
 Sophie Luck, Australian actress
 Charles Oliveira, Brazilian mixed martial artist
 October 18 – Matthew Centrowitz Jr., American middle-distance runner
 October 19 – Miroslav Stoch, Slovak footballer
 October 20 – Jess Glynne, British singer
 October 23 – Jonita Gandhi, Indo-Canadian singer
 October 24
 Cristian Gamboa, Costa Rican footballer 
 Shenae Grimes, Canadian actress
 Eric Hosmer, American professional baseball player
 PewDiePie, Swedish and former most subscribed YouTuber, comedian, commentator, and philanthropist
 Eliza Taylor, Australian actress
 October 25 – Mia Wasikowska, Australian actress
 October 28 – Camille Muffat, French swimmer (d. 2015)
 October 29 
 Irina Karamanos, Chilean anthropologist and political scientist
 Primož Roglič, Slovenian cyclist
 October 30 – Nastia Liukin, American artistic gymnast and Olympic gold medalist

November 

 November 2 
 Stevan Jovetić, Montenegrin footballer
 Katelyn Tarver, American singer, songwriter and actress
 November 3
 Paula DeAnda, Mexican-born American singer
 Joyce Jonathan, French singer
 Damian Warner, Canadian decathlete
 November 5 – Katerine Duska, Canadian born-Greek singer
 November 6 – Jozy Altidore, American soccer player
 November 7 – Nadya Tolokonnikova, Russian political activist and musician
 November 8 – Morgan Schneiderlin, French footballer
 November 9 
 Gianluca Bezzina, Maltese doctor and singer
 Marcus Daniell, New Zealand tennis player
 November 10 – Taron Egerton, British actor
 November 11
 Joe Ragland, American basketball player
 Reina Tanaka, Japanese pop-rock singer
 November 12 – Aseel Omran, Saudi Arabian singer
 November 14 – Emis Killa, Italian rapper
 November 18 – Vera Sola, American-Canadian singer-songwriter, multi-instrumentalist, and recording artist
 November 19
 Caitlynne Medrek, Canadian actress and voice actress
 Tyga, American rapper
 November 20
 Cody Linley, American actor
 Sergei Polunin, Ukrainian ballet dancer
 Eduardo Vargas, Chilean footballer
 November 21 – Fabian Delph, English footballer
 November 22 – Alden Ehrenreich, American actor
 November 23 – Margot van Geffen, Dutch field hockey player
 November 25 – Tom Dice, Belgian singer-songwriter
 November 27 – Loveli, Japanese model
 November 30 
 Kimberly Hill, American volleyball player
 Ferguson Rotich, Kenyan middle distance runner
 Vladimír Weiss, Slovak footballer

December 

 December 1 – Neal Skupski, British tennis player
 December 2
 Cassie Steele, Canadian actress and singer
 Robert Turbin, American football player
 December 3 – Bette Franke, Dutch model
 December 4
 Garron DuPree, American musician
 Nafessa Williams, American actress
 December 5
 Gregory Tyree Boyce, American actor
 Katy Kung, Hong Kong actress
 Kwon Yu-ri, Korean singer
 December 7 
 Matthias Brändle, Austrian racing cyclist
 Nicholas Hoult, British actor
 December 8 
 Drew Doughty, Canadian Ice Hockey player
 Behdad Salimi, Iranian weightlifter
 December 9 – Eric Bledsoe, American basketball player
 December 10 – Marion Maréchal, French politician
 December 11 – Kellie Harrington, Irish boxer
 December 12 – Janelle Arthur, American singer
 December 13
 Chen Xiang, Chinese pop singer and actor
 Katherine Schwarzenegger, American author
 Taylor Swift, American singer-songwriter and record producer
 December 14 
 Lauren Boyle, New Zealand swimmer
 Onew, Korean singer
 December 15 – Héléna Ciak, French basketball player
 December 17 – Andre Ayew, Ghanaian footballer
 December 18 – Ashley Benson, American actress
 December 19
 Valdimar Bergstað, Icelandic horse rider
 David Gbemie, Liberian international footballer
 Yong Jun-hyung, Korean singer
 December 21
 Thorbjørn Olesen, Danish professional golfer
 Tamannaah, Indian model and actress
 December 22
 Logan Huffman, American actor
 Jordin Sparks, American singer
 December 26
 Yohan Blake, Jamaican athlete
 Sora Tokui, Japanese voice actress, singer and manga artist
 Keenan MacWilliam, Canadian actress, singer, dancer, writer and director
 December 27 
 Kateryna Lagno, Ukrainian chess player
 Sun Wenyan, Chinese synchronised swimmer
 December 28
 Jessie Buckley, Irish actress and singer
 Mackenzie Rosman, American actress
 Salvador Sobral, Portuguese singer
 December 29
 Jane Levy, American actress
 Kei Nishikori, Japanese tennis player
 December 30 
 Alix Klineman, American beach volleyball player
 Ryan Sheckler, American skateboarder

Deaths

January
 January 6
 Jim Hurtubise, American race car driver (b. 1932)
 Sir Edmund Leach, British anthropologist (b. 1910)
 January 7
 Frank Adams, British mathematician (b. 1930)
 Hirohito, Emperor of Japan (b. 1901)
 January 8 – Kenneth McMillan, American actor (b. 1932)
 January 10 – Herbert Morrison, American radio reporter (b. 1905)
 January 11 – José Bustamante y Rivero, Peruvian politician, diplomat and jurist, 33rd President of Peru (b. 1894)
 January 13 – Joe Spinell, American actor (b. 1936)
 January 14 – Robert B. Anderson, American administrator and businessman (b. 1910)
 January 16
 Prem Nazir, Indian actor (b. 1926)
 Trey Wilson, American actor (b. 1948)
 January 17 – Óscar Vargas Prieto, Peruvian soldier and politician, 111th Prime Minister of Peru (b. 1917)
 January 18 – Bruce Chatwin, British author (b. 1940)
 January 19 – Norma Varden, English actress (b. 1898)
 January 20 
 Józef Cyrankiewicz, Polish communist politician, 2-time Prime Minister of Poland and 15th President of Poland (b. 1911)
 Beatrice Lillie, Canadian actress (b. 1894)
 January 21 – Billy Tipton, American musician (b. 1914)
 January 23 – Salvador Dalí, Spanish artist (b. 1904)
 January 24 – Ted Bundy, American serial killer (b. 1946)
 January 27 – Sir Thomas Sopwith, British aviation pioneer and yachtsman (b. 1888)
 January 28 – Halina Konopacka, Polish Olympic athlete (b. 1900)
 January 30 – Alfonso, Duke of Anjou and Cádiz (b. 1936)
 January 31 – Fernando Gonçalves Namora, Portuguese writer and doctor (b. 1919)

February
 February 1 – Elaine de Kooning, American artist (b. 1919)
 February 2
 Yuri Bogatyryov, Soviet actor (b. 1947)
 Ondrej Nepela, Slovakian figure skater (b. 1951)
 February 3 – John Cassavetes, American actor (b. 1929) 
 February 4 – Trevor Lucas, Australian folk singer (b. 1943)
 February 6 – Barbara W. Tuchman, American historian (b. 1912)
 February 9 – Osamu Tezuka, Japanese artist (b. 1928)
 February 11 – T. E. B. Clarke, British screenwriter (b. 1907)
 February 13 – Princess Eugénie of Greece and Denmark (b. 1910)
 February 14
 James Bond, American ornithologist (b. 1900)
 Vincent Crane, British musician (b. 1943)
 February 17 – Lefty Gomez, American baseball player (b. 1908)
 February 21 – Sándor Márai, Hungarian writer and journalist (b. 1900)
 February 26 – Roy Eldridge, American musician (b. 1911)
 February 27
 Paul Oswald Ahnert, German astronomer (b. 1897)
 Konrad Lorenz, Austrian zoologist, recipient of the Nobel Prize in Physiology or Medicine (b. 1903)

March
 March 6 – Harry Andrews, British actor (b. 1911)
 March 9 – Robert Mapplethorpe, American activist, artist and photographer (b. 1946)
 March 10 – Maurizio Merli, Italian actor (b. 1940)
 March 12 – Maurice Evans, British actor (b. 1901)
 March 14
 Edward Abbey, American author and environmentalist (b. 1927)
 Zita of Bourbon-Parma, Queen consort of Hungary and Empress consort of Austria (b. 1892)
 March 16 – Jesús María de Leizaola, Spanish politician (b. 1896)
 March 17 – Merritt Butrick, American actor (b. 1959)
 March 20 – Dina Sfat, Brazilian actress (b. 1938)
 March 25 – Sa`id Al-Mufti, Jordanian political figure, 9th Prime Minister of Jordan (b. 1898)
 March 27
 May Allison, American actress (b. 1890)
 Jack Starrett, American actor and director (b. 1936)
 March 29
 Bernard Blier, French actor (b. 1916)
 Aleksandr Prokopenko, Soviet footballer (b. 1953)

April
 April 1 – George Robledo, Chilean soccer player (b. 1926)
 April 3 – Mustafa Çağatay, Turkish-Cypriot politician, 3rd Prime Minister of Northern Cyprus (b. 1937)
 April 6 – Tufton Beamish, Baron Chelwood, British army officer and politician (b. 1917)
 April 12 
Abbie Hoffman, American political activist (b. 1936)
Sugar Ray Robinson, American professional boxer (b. 1921)
 April 15
 Hu Yaobang, General Secretary of the Chinese Communist Party (b. 1915)
 Bernard-Marie Koltès, French playwright (b. 1948)
 April 19 – Dame Daphne du Maurier, British writer (b. 1907)
 April 20 — Edward DeSaulnier, American politician (b. 1921)
 April 21
 Princess Deokhye of Korea (b. 1912)
 James Kirkwood Jr., American playwright (b. 1924)
 April 22 – Emilio Segrè, Italian physicist, Nobel Prize laureate (b. 1905)
 April 23 
 Hamani Diori, Nigerien politician, 1st President of Niger (b. 1916)
 Hu Die, Chinese actress (b. 1907)
 April 24 – Edgar Sanabria, Venezuelan lawyer, diplomat and politician, Interim President of Venezuela (b. 1911)
 April 25 – George Coulouris, British actor (b. 1903)
 April 26 – Lucille Ball, American actress, comedian and entertainer (b. 1911)
 April 27 – Konosuke Matsushita, Japanese industrialist (b. 1894)
 April 30
 Sergio Leone, Italian film director (b. 1929)
 Guy Williams, Italian-born American actor (b. 1924)

May
 May 1 – Edward Ochab, Polish activist and politician, 13th President of Poland (b. 1906)
 May 2 – Giuseppe Siri, Italian cardinal (b. 1906)
 May 3 – Christine Jorgensen, Norwegian actress, singer and writer (b. 1926)
 May 9 – Keith Whitley, American country music singer (b. 1955)
 May 10 – Woody Shaw, American jazz trumpeter (b. 1944)
 May 15 – Johnny Green, American songwriter (b. 1908)
 May 19
 Anton Diffring, German actor (b. 1916)
 Robert Webber, American actor (b. 1924)
 May 20
 John Hicks, British economist, Nobel Prize laureate (b. 1904)
 Gilda Radner, American comedian and actress (b. 1946)
 May 26 – Don Revie, English footballer and manager (b. 1927)
 May 29 
 John Cipollina, American guitarist (b. 1943)
 Giuseppe Patanè, Italian conductor (b. 1932)
 May 31 – C. L. R. James, Trinidadian journalist and writer (b. 1901)

June
 June 3 – Ruhollah Khomeini, Iranian philosopher, politician, revolutionary and Shia Muslim religious leader, 1st Supreme Leader of Iran (b. 1902)
 June 4 – Dik Browne, American cartoonist (b. 1917)
 June 7 – Nara Leão, Brazilian singer (b. 1942)
 June 8 – Albert Spaggiari, French criminal (b. 1932)
 June 9
 George Beadle, American geneticist, recipient of the Nobel Prize in Physiology or Medicine (b. 1903)
 Rashid Behbudov, Azerbaijani singer and actor (b. 1915)
 José López Rega, Argentine politician (b. 1916)
 June 10 – Richard Quine, American actor (b. 1920)
 June 13 – Fran Allison, American actress and television personality (b. 1907)
 June 14 – Joseph Malula, Congolese archbishop and cardinal (b. 1917)
 June 15
 Victor French, American actor and director (b. 1934)
 Ray McAnally, Irish actor (b. 1926)
 June 17 – John Matuszak, American football player and actor (b. 1950)
 June 21 – Lee Calhoun, American Olympic athlete (b. 1933)
 June 23 – Werner Best, German Nazi official, jurist, police chief and SS-Obergruppenführer leader (b. 1903)
 June 24
 Hibari Misora, Japanese singer (b. 1937)
 Prince Vasili Alexandrovich of Russia (b. 1907)
 June 25 – Diarmuid Larkin, Irish artist and art educationist (b. 1918)
 June 27
 Sir Alfred Ayer, British philosopher (b. 1910)
 Jack Buetel, American actor (b. 1915)
 Michele Lupo, Italian film director (b. 1932)
 June 28 – Joris Ivens, Dutch filmmaker (b. 1898)
 June 30 – Hilmar Baunsgaard, Danish politician and 34th Prime Minister of Denmark (b. 1920)

July
 July 2
 Andrei Gromyko, Soviet politician and diplomat (b. 1909)
 Franklin Schaffner, American film director (b. 1920)
 Ben Wright, British actor in radio, film and television (b. 1915)
 July 3 – Jim Backus, American actor (b. 1913)
 July 4 
 Win Maung, 3rd President of Myanmar (b. 1916)
 Leyla Mammadbeyova, Azerbaijani aviator (b. 1909)
 July 6 – János Kádár, Hungarian politician and communist leader, 46th Prime Minister of Hungary (b. 1912)
 July 10 – Mel Blanc, American voice actor and radio personality (b. 1908)
 July 11 – Laurence Olivier, English actor and director (b. 1907)
 July 12 – Prince Wolfgang of Hesse (b. 1896)
 July 15 – Laurie Cunningham, English footballer (b. 1956)
 July 16 – Herbert von Karajan, Austrian conductor (b. 1908)
 July 17 – Paul C, American hip hop record producer (b. 1964)
 July 18 – Rebecca Schaeffer, American actress (b. 1967)
 July 19 – Kazimierz Sabbat, 2-time Prime Minister of Poland and 15th President of Poland (b. 1913)
 July 20
 Forrest H. Anderson, American politician (b. 1913)
 Mary Treen, American actress (b. 1907)
 July 22 – Martti Talvela, Finnish bass (b. 1935)
 July 23
 Donald Barthelme, American writer (b. 1931)
 Archduchess Charlotte of Austria (b. 1921)
 July 24 – Ernie Morrison, American actor (b. 1912)

August
 August 1 – John Ogdon, British pianist (b. 1937)
 August 12 – William Shockley, American physicist, Nobel Prize laureate (b. 1910)
 August 13
 Hugo del Carril, Argentine film actor, film director and tango singer (b. 1912)
 Tim Richmond, American race car driver (b. 1955)
 August 14 – Robert Bernard Anderson, American political figure (b. 1910)
 August 15 – Minoru Genda, Japanese aviator, naval officer and politician (b. 1904)
 August 16
 Jean-Hilaire Aubame, French-born Gabonese politician (b. 1912)
 Amanda Blake, American actress (b. 1929)
 August 18 – Luis Carlos Galan, Colombian politician (b. 1943)
 August 20
 George Adamson, Indian-born American conservationist (b. 1906)
 Joseph LaShelle, American cinematographer (b. 1900)
 August 21 – Raul Seixas, Brazilian rock singer (b. 1945)
 August 22
 Huey P. Newton, African-American political activist (b. 1942)
 Diana Vreeland, American fashion editor (b. 1929)
 August 23 – R. D. Laing, British psychiatrist (b. 1927)
 August 26 – Irving Stone, American writer (b. 1903)
 August 27 – Luiz Luz, Brazilian footballer (b. 1909)
 August 29
 Pua Kealoha, American Olympic swimmer (b. 1902)
 Sir Peter Scott, British naturalist, artist and explorer (b. 1909)

September

 September 4
 Georges Simenon, Belgian writer (b. 1903)
 Ronald Syme, New Zealand-born classicist and historian (b. 1903)
 September 13 – Charles H. Russell, American politician, 20th Governor of Nevada (b. 1903)
 September 14 – Dámaso Pérez Prado, Cuban musician (b. 1916)
 September 15 – Robert Penn Warren, American writer (b. 1905)
 September 22 – Irving Berlin, American composer (b. 1888)
 September 28 – Ferdinand Marcos, Filipino dictator, politician and statesman, 10th President of the Philippines (b. 1917)
 September 30
 Virgil Thomson, American composer (b. 1896)
 Huỳnh Tấn Phát, Vietnamese politician, 16th Prime Minister of the Republic of Vietnam (b. 1913)

October

 October 2
 Paola Barbara, Italian actress (b. 1912)
 Vittorio Caprioli, Italian actor, director and screenwriter (b. 1921)
 October 4
 Graham Chapman, British comedian (b. 1941)
 Secretariat, American Thoroughbred racehorse (b. 1970)
 October 6 – Bette Davis, American actress (b. 1908)
 October 11
 M. King Hubbert, American geophysicist (b. 1903)
 Paul Shenar, American actor (b. 1936)
 October 12 – Jay Ward, American animation producer (b. 1920)
 October 15 – Scott O'Dell, American children's writer (b. 1898)
 October 16 – Cornel Wilde, American actor (b. 1915)
 October 18 – Countess Georgina, Princess consort of Liechtenstein (b. 1921)
 October 20 – Sir Anthony Quayle, British actor (b. 1913)
 October 22
 Ewan MacColl, British folk singer, political activist and actor (b. 1915)
 Jacob Wetterling, American murder victim (b. 1978)
 Roland Winters, American actor (b. 1904)
 October 25 – Mary McCarthy, American writer (b. 1912)
 October 26 – Charles J. Pedersen, American chemist, Nobel Prize laureate (b. 1904)
 October 28 – Yuliya Solntseva, Soviet actress (b. 1901)
 October 30 – Pedro Vargas, Mexican singer and actor (b. 1906)

November

 November 3 – Timoci Bavadra, Fijian physician and politician, 2nd Prime Minister of Fiji (b. 1934)
 November 5 
 Vladimir Horowitz, Russian pianist (b. 1903)
 Barry Sadler, American soldier and singer-songwriter (b. 1940)
 November 12 – Édouard Candeveau, Swiss Olympic rower (b. 1898)
 November 13
 Victor Davis, Canadian Olympic swimmer (b. 1964)
 Franz Joseph II, Prince of Liechtenstein (b. 1906)
 November 16 – Ignacio Ellacuría, Jesuit priest and theologian (b. 1930)
 November 20
 Lynn Bari, American actress (b. 1913)
 Leonardo Sciascia, Italian writer (b. 1921)
 November 22 – René Moawad, Lebanese lawyer and politician, 13th President of Lebanon (b. 1925)
 November 24 – Abdullah Yusuf Azzam, Palestinian Sunni Islamic scholar and theologian (b. 1941)
 November 26 – Ahmed Abdallah, Comorian politician, 1st President of Comoros (b. 1919)
 November 27 – Carlos Arias Navarro, Spanish politician, Prime Minister of Spain (b. 1908)
 November 28 – Ernesto Civardi, Italian cardinal (b. 1906)
 November 29 – Gubby Allen, English cricketer (b. 1902)
 November 30
 Ahmadou Ahidjo, Cameroonian politician, 1st Prime Minister of Cameroon and President of Cameroon (b. 1924)
 Hassan Fathy, Egyptian architect (b. 1900)

December

 December 1 – Alvin Ailey, American dancer and choreographer (b. 1931)
 December 3
 Sourou-Migan Apithy, Beninese political figure, 2nd President of Dahomey (b. 1913)
 Fernando Martín Espina, Spanish basketball player (b. 1962)
 December 5 – John Pritchard, British conductor (b. 1921)
 December 6
 Frances Bavier, American actress (b. 1902)
 Sammy Fain, American composer (b. 1902)
 John Payne, American actor (b. 1912)
 December 8 – Hans Hartung, German-born French painter (b. 1904)
 December 14
 Jock Mahoney, American actor (b. 1919)
 Andrei Sakharov, Soviet physicist and activist, recipient of the Nobel Peace Prize (b. 1921)
 December 15
 José Gonzalo Rodríguez Gacha, Colombian drug lord and criminal (b. 1947)
 Edward Underdown, British stage and film veteran (b. 1908)
 December 16
 Silvana Mangano, Italian actress (b. 1930)
 Aileen Pringle, American actress (b. 1895)
 Lee Van Cleef, American actor (b. 1925)
 December 17 – Albert C. Wedemeyer, American general (b. 1897)
 December 19
 Herbert Blaize, Grenadian politician, 6th Prime Minister of Grenada (b. 1918)
 Kirill Mazurov, Soviet politician (b. 1914)
 December 20 – Kurt Böhme, German bass (b. 1908)
 December 21 – Ján Cikker, Slovak composer (b. 1911)
 December 22
 Samuel Beckett, Irish writer, Nobel Prize laureate (b. 1906)
 Vasile Milea, Romanian military officer and politician, minister of Defense (b. 1927)
 December 23 – Richard Rado, German-born British mathematician (b. 1906)
 December 25
 Elena Ceaușescu, Romanian politician, Deputy Prime Minister of Romania (b. 1916)
 Nicolae Ceaușescu, Romanian politician, dictator and Communist Party head, 1st President of Romania (b. 1918)
 Billy Martin, American baseball player and manager (b. 1928)
 December 26 – Lennox Berkeley, English composer (b. 1903)
 December 28 – Hermann Oberth, Austro-Hungarian-born German engineer, physicist and scientist (b. 1894)
 December 30 – Yasuji Miyazaki, Japanese Olympic swimmer (b. 1916)
 December 31
 Sir Ignatius Kilage, 4th Governor-General of Papua New Guinea (b. 1941)
 Mihály Lantos, Hungarian footballer and manager (b. 1928)
 Gerhard Schröder, German politician (b. 1910)
 December – Yem Sambaur, 8th Prime Minister of Cambodia (b. 1913)

Nobel Prizes

 Physics – Norman Foster Ramsey Jr., Hans Georg Dehmelt, Wolfgang Paul
 Chemistry – Sidney Altman, Thomas Cech
 Medicine – J. Michael Bishop, Harold E. Varmus
 Literature – Camilo José Cela
 Peace – Tenzin Gyatso, 14th Dalai Lama
 Bank of Sweden Prize in Economic Sciences in Memory of Alfred Nobel – Trygve Haavelmo

References

Further reading
 Ash, Timothy Garton. The Magic Lantern: The Revolution of '89 Witnessed in Warsaw, Budapest, Berlin, and Prague (1999) excerpt 
 Kenney, Padraic, ed. 1989: Democratic Revolutions at the Cold War's End: A Brief History with Documents (2009) 
 Sebestyen, Victor. Revolution 1989: The Fall of the Soviet Empire (2010) excerpt

External links
 
 After the fall – Europe after 1989
 Mikhail Gorbachev on 1989 – 2009 interview by The Nation
 Freedom Without Walls: German Missions in the United States Looking Back at the Fall of the Berlin Wall – official homepage in English